Merlin's grass is a common name for several plants and may refer to:

Isoetes lacustris
Isoetes tegetiformans, endemic to the U.S. state of Georgia